Rod Laver defeated Tony Roche in the final, 7–9, 6–1, 6–2, 6–2 to win the men's singles tennis title at the 1969 US Open. With the win, he completed the Grand Slam, and remains the only man in the Open Era to do so in singles. Laver also became the second man in history to complete the double career Grand Slam, after Roy Emerson.

Arthur Ashe was the defending champion, but lost in the semifinals to Laver.

1969 would be the last year when a player reached all four major finals, until 2006 when Roger Federer did so.

Seeds
The seeded players are listed below. Rod Laver is the champion; others show the round in which they were eliminated.

  Rod Laver, (champion)
  John Newcombe, (semifinals)
  Tony Roche, (finals)
  Arthur Ashe, (semifinals)
  Tom Okker, (first round)
  Ken Rosewall, (quarterfinals)
  Clark Graebner, (second round)
  Cliff Drysdale, (first round)
  Roy Emerson, (quarterfinals)
  Fred Stolle, (quarterfinals)
  Andrés Gimeno, (fourth round)
  Stan Smith, (second round)
  Richard Pancho Gonzales, (fourth round)
  Manuel Santana, (fourth round)
  Marty Riessen, (fourth round)
  Dennis Ralston, (fourth round)

Qualifying

Draw

Key
 Q = Qualifier
 WC = Wild card
 LL = Lucky loser
 r = Retired

Final eight

Section 1

Section 2

Section 3

Section 4

Section 5

Section 6

Section 7

Section 8

External links
 Association of Tennis Professionals (ATP) – 1969 US Open Men's Singles draw
1969 US Open – Men's draws and results at the International Tennis Federation

US Open (tennis) by year – Men's singles
M